Puebla Athletic Club was a Mexican football club from the city of Puebla. Its football team played in the Primera Fuerza prior to the professionalization and development of the Primera División de México in 1943.

History
"Puebla Athletic Club" was founded February 10, 1894 ( Puebla Football club was founded on December 10, 1892 ) by William R. Turnbull who decided to create a football Association club that same year and challenge clubs from Mexico City .Since there were no Clubs establish at the time in the capital those who practice the sports join forces to represent the city against Puebla . This game took place in Puebla city on February 7, 1894 in the old Velódromo Park .The match ended 2-0 in favor for Puebla A.C ,The Two Republics'' states that the goals were scored by TR Phillips''' who went on to found Reforma AC and by Claude M Butlin ( who was the first highly train athlete  to migrate to Mexico ) .this match fueled the interest in this new sport which was short lived being that Cricket had become more popular and had become more organized witch clubs popping in and around Mexico .

In 1902 the Club was invited to play in the newly created Primera Fuerza but do to the lack of football players they decline the invitation saying they would take it up in the future .During the late 1890s and early 1990s the club would mainly practice tennis , cricket and baseball .In 1904 Puebla would finally join the Primera Fuerza taking this 2 years to better establish once again its football club.

In their first tournament in 1904–05 Puebla lost all games and didn't score a goal in the 8 matches played, therefore finishing last. In the 1905–06 season, the club struggled and managed to score its first and only goal in that tournament, finishing last with no wins, 1 draw and 7 losses, and 20 goals against.

For the 1906–07 season Puebla finished third with 3 wins, 3 losses and 2 draws for a total of 9 points with 8 goals scored and 6 against. This tournament was the club's last in the league mostly due to the lack of interest from the people of Puebla with the native Mexican crowd not supporting an English only football club.

The City of Puebla would not see Football for 8 years until 1915, when the First Puebla FC (Became España de Puebla in 1916 after joying forces with Real Club España )by Spaniards living in Puebla. Due to the lack of opponents, having only one with neighboring town San Martín Texmelucan, the club would be forced to go Orizaba, Veracruz to find competition where they participated for a few years in the old "Liga Veracruzana de Fútbol". Another club was founded this time mostly by Mexican in 1917 under the name of "Reforma". Other clubs would soon be formed by French and German immigrants which only lasted a few years. It wasn't till 1944 –a year after the first professional football league was established in Mexico– that the city finally had a professional club Puebla FC which was founded on May 7, 1944.

Primera Fuerza

From 1904–07

After the 1906–07 season, Puebla A.C. folded

First kit evolution

See also
Football in Mexico
Reforma Athletic Club
Albinegros de Orizaba
Puebla FC

References

Defunct football clubs in Puebla
Association football clubs established in 1897
Primera Fuerza teams